La Petite Nicole is the fifth release of the Montreal-based instrumental act Torngat.

Track listing
 "Interlude" - 1:17
 "La Petite Nicole" - 7:13
 "L'école Pénitencier" - 4:24
 "Afternoon Moon Pie" - 5:40
 "6:23 pm" - 5:48
 "Turtle Eyes & Fierce Rabbit" - 6:00
 "Going What's What" - 7:36

References

2009 albums
Torngat albums